The Korean Catholic Bible (Korean: 한국 가톨릭 성경, Hangug Gatollig Seong-gyeong), or Holy Bible (Korean: 성경, Seong-gyeong), is the Korean language Bible used by Korean Catholics. This version is the standard Bible for the Roman Catholic Church in Korea since 2005, replacing the Common Translation Bible.

See also
 Bible translations
 Bible translations into Korean
 Christianity in South Korea
 Catholic Church in South Korea

References

External links
 Full text of the Korean Catholic Bible (2005) (CBCK website)
 Overview of Seonggyeong

2005 books
2005 in Christianity
Christianity in South Korea